Germany competed at the 2004 Summer Olympics in Athens, Greece, from 13 to 29 August 2004. This was the nation's fourth consecutive appearance at the Summer Olympics after its reunification in 1990. The German Olympic Sports Confederation (DOSB) sent the nation's second largest delegation to the Games since its reunification. A total of 441 athletes, 250 men and 191 women, competed in 27 sports, and were nominated by DOSB at four occasions.

Medalists

| width="78%" align="left" valign="top" |

| width="22%" align="left" valign="top" |

Archery

Germany has qualified a spot in the men's individual event, and in the women's team.

Athletics

German athletes have so far achieved qualifying standards in the following athletics events (up to a maximum of 3 athletes in each event at the 'A' Standard, and 1 at the 'B' Standard).

Men
Track & road events

Field events

Combined events – Decathlon

Women
Track & road events

Field events

Combined events – Heptathlon

Badminton 

Men

Women

Mixed

Boxing

Germany sent four boxers to the 2004 Olympics.  They won two bronze medals as the team went for a combined record of 6-4.  Germany was in a four-way tie for 12th place in the boxing medals scoreboard.

Canoeing

Germany entered 19 canoes in the canoeing competition in 2004.  18 qualified for semifinals, 17 qualified for finals, and 16 placed in the top 8.  9 won medals, including 4 gold, 4 silver, and 1 bronze.  This made Germany the most successful nation in the Athens canoeing competition.

Slalom

Sprint

Women

Qualification Legend: Q = Qualify to final; q = Qualify to semifinal

Cycling

Road
Men

Women

Track
Sprint

Pursuit

Time trial

Keirin

Omnium

Mountain biking

Diving 

Germany has qualified 10 athletes, including a single pair in the men's synchronized springboard, and two more in both women's synchronized springboard and platform.

Men

Women

Equestrian

Germany has qualified a spot for the team each in dressage, eventing, and show jumping. Eventing rider Bettina Hoy originally claimed a gold medal for herself and the German team, but three countries filed an appeal on the FEI Ground Jury, that overturned the judges' decision to nullify her original results. Therefore, the German eventing team finished outside the medals in fourth place, and Hoy claimed a ninth spot overall in the official results. Meanwhile, show jumper Ludger Beerbaum and his horse Goldfever helped the Germans claim a gold medal in the team event, but Goldfever tested positive for the prohibited substance betamethasone. As a result, Beerbaum was disqualified from the tournament, and instead, his teammates Christian Ahlmann, Otto Becker, and Marco Kutscher dropped their leading position for the bronze, even without Goldfever's results.

Dressage

Eventing

"#" indicates that the score of this rider does not count in the team competition, since only the best three results of a team are counted.

Show jumping

Fencing

Men

Women

Field hockey

Men's tournament

Roster

Group play

Semifinal

Bronze Medal Final

 Won Bronze Medal

Women's tournament

Roster

Group play

Semifinal

Gold Medal Final

 Won Gold Medal

Football

Women's tournament

Roster

Group play

Quarterfinal

Semifinal

Bronze Medal Final

 Won Bronze Medal

Gymnastics

Artistic
Men
Team

Individual finals

Women

Rhythmic

Trampoline

Handball

Men's tournament

Roster

Group play

Quarterfinal

Semifinal

Gold Medal Final

 Won Silver Medal

Judo

Germany has qualified twelve judoka (five men and seven women).

Men

Women

Modern pentathlon

Germany has qualified three athletes in modern pentathlon.

Rowing

Men

Women

Qualification Legend: FA=Final A (medal); FB=Final B (non-medal); FC=Final C (non-medal); FD=Final D (non-medal); FE=Final E (non-medal); FF=Final F (non-medal); SA/B=Semifinals A/B; SC/D=Semifinals C/D; SE/F=Semifinals E/F; R=Repechage

Sailing

Men

Women

Open

M = Medal race; OCS = On course side of the starting line; DSQ = Disqualified; DNF = Did not finish; DNS= Did not start; RDG = Redress given

Shooting 

Men

* Won in shoot-off

Women

* Won in shoot-off

Swimming 

German swimmers earned qualifying standards in the following events (up to a maximum of 2 swimmers in each event at the A-standard time, and 1 at the B-standard time): Swimmers qualified from the German Olympic Trials.

Men

* Competed only in heats and received medals

Women

* Competed only in heats and received medals

Table tennis

Men

Women

Tennis

Triathlon

Germany's five triathletes in 2004 included three veterans, but the defending silver medallist was not among them.  Each of the three improved upon their ranking from four years earlier, while the two rookie men also had solid races.  Germany earned no medals in the 2004 triathlons, but did have a top eight finisher.

Volleyball

Beach

Indoor

Women's tournament

Roster

Group play

Water polo

Men's tournament

Roster

Group play

Quarterfinal

5th-6th Classification

Weightlifting

Wrestling 

Men's freestyle

Men's Greco-Roman

Women's freestyle

See also
 Germany at the 2004 Summer Paralympics

References

External links
Official Report of the XXVIII Olympiad
Official Website – German Olympic Team 

Nations at the 2004 Summer Olympics
2004
Summer Olympics